The Pat Lyddan House, located south of Mooresville, Kentucky on Kentucky Route 55, was built in 1853.  It was listed on the National Register of Historic Places in 1989.

It is a three-bay, two-story, log house built by Pat Lyddan with elements of Greek Revival style (in the recessed central entrance with sidelights, transom, pilasters, and architrave).

It has also been known as the Ed Yocum Place.

References

Houses on the National Register of Historic Places in Kentucky
Greek Revival architecture in Kentucky
Houses completed in 1853
National Register of Historic Places in Washington County, Kentucky
1853 establishments in Kentucky
Houses in Washington County, Kentucky